James Robertson (born 11 August 1928), a British-born political and economic thinker and activist, became an independent writer and speaker in 1974 after an early career as a British civil servant.

He studied Greats at Balliol College, Oxford, from 1946 to 1950, where he played cricket and rugby union, and ran cross-country for the university.

After serving on British Prime Minister Harold Macmillan’s staff during his "Wind of Change" tour of Africa in 1960, Robertson spent three years in the Cabinet Office. Following that he became director of the Inter-Bank Research Organisation for the big British banks.

In the mid-1980s Robertson was a prominent co-founder with his wife, Alison Pritchard, of The Other Economic Summit (TOES) and the New Economics Foundation (NEF). He is a member of FEASTA and a patron of SANE (South Africa New Economics Foundation), which was set up following his visit there in 1996.

In October 2003, at the XXIX annual conference of the Pio Manzu Research Centre, Rimini, Italy (closely associated with the UN), he was awarded a gold medal for his "remarkable contribution to the promotion of a new economics grounded in social and spiritual values" over the past 25 years.

Robertson joined the advisory board of International Simultaneous Policy Organization which seeks to end the usual deadlock in tackling global issues through an international simultaneous policy.

Robertson's latest book is the Future Money: Breakdown or Breakthrough? (Green Books, 2012).

He and his wife live in Oxfordshire.

Recurring themes of his work
Basic Income
Citizen's income
Ecological consciousness
Economic justice
Feminism
Globalisation
Land value tax
Local self-reliance
Monetary reform, system of money and finance
Economics of local recovery
Patterns of change
Sane alternative
Social investment
Social justice
Voluntary simplicity

Books
 Future Money: Breakdown or Breakthrough? (2012), 
 Monetary Reform - Making it Happen (2004), 
 Creating New Money: A Monetary Reform for the Information Age (co-written with Joseph Huber) (New Economics Foundation, 2000), 
 The New Economics of Sustainable Development: A Briefing for Policy Makers (written for the European Commissions Cellule de Prospective (Forward Studies Unit) in 1997) (London: Kogan Page, 1999), 
 Transforming Economic Life: A Millennial Challenge (Schumacher Briefing No 1, Green Books, 1998), 
 Beyond the Dependency Culture: People, Power and Responsibility (Adamantine/Praeger, 1998) 
 Sharing Our Common Heritage: Resource Taxes and Green Dividends (1998)
 Future Wealth: A New Economics for the 21st Century (1989), 
 Future Work: Jobs, Employment and Leisure after the Industrial Age (1985)
 The Sane Alternative: a choice of futures (1980), 
 Power, Money and Sex: Towards a New Social Balance (1976), 
 Profit or People? The New Social Role of Money (1974), 
 Reform of British Central Government (1971),

See also
 Full-reserve banking

References

External links
 Working for a Sane Alternative - Robertson's web site, with biography, and downloadable texts of many of the books listed above
 Future Money book - publisher's web page for Robertson's latest book Future Money

1928 births
Living people
Civil servants in the Cabinet Office
British economists
British non-fiction writers
Monetary reformers
People from Oxfordshire
Sustainability advocates
Recipients of the Medal of the Presidency of the Italian Republic
English rugby union players
Oxford University RFC players
Place of birth missing (living people)
British male writers
Male non-fiction writers